Iakov Broud (March 24, 1900 – July 27, 1942) was a Soviet army commander. He fought in the wars against the White movement and Finland. He was a recipient of the Order of the Red Banner. He commanded the artillery in the 28th Army and the 64th Army. He was killed in action at Stalingrad in 1942 supervising his troops crossing the Don River.

References

Citations

Bibliography 

Soviet military personnel of the Russian Civil War
Soviet military personnel killed in World War II
Soviet major generals
Recipients of the Order of the Red Banner
1900 births
1942 deaths